College GameDay (branded as ESPN College GameDay built by The Home Depot for sponsorship reasons) is a pre-game show broadcast by ESPN as part of the network's coverage of college football, broadcast on Saturday mornings during the college football season. In its current form, the program is typically broadcast from the campus of the team hosting a featured game being played that day and features news and analysis of the day's upcoming games.

It first aired in 1987 with Tim Brando as host and Lee Corso and Beano Cook as commentators, giving an overview of college football games. Karie Ross soon became the first female to join the broadcast. The show underwent a radical transformation beginning in 1993, and began incorporating live broadcasts. Today, the only original cast member remaining is Lee Corso, whose appearances have been pre-scripted since suffering a stroke in 2009. Rece Davis serves as host and Kirk Herbstreit is Corso's counterpart. Desmond Howard was added to the cast of the show in 2008. Craig James served as an analyst from 1990 to 1995. Erin Andrews joined the GameDay crew as a co-host and contributor in 2010, replaced in 2012 by Samantha Ponder (and in 2017 by Maria Taylor after Ponder left to become host of Sunday NFL Countdown that same year).  In 2015, Rece Davis (also host of the college basketball version of GameDay) replaced Chris Fowler as host of the show. In 2010, the program was expanded from two to three hours, with the opening hour broadcast on ESPNU until 2013.

The show is known for its prediction segment that appears at the end of each broadcast. Typically there are five predictors: Corso, Herbstreit, Howard, McAfee, and an invited guest, usually a celebrity, prominent athlete, or radio personality associated with the host school for that week. The show always concludes with Corso's prediction for the host school's game, after which he dons the mascot's headgear of the team he predicts to win the game, usually to the ire or excitement of local fans. As of January 9, 2023, Corso is 263–134 in his headgear picks. His first headgear pick occurred on October 5, 1996, when he correctly picked the Ohio State Buckeyes over the Penn State Nittany Lions. In 2018, Corso made his first NFL headgear pick when, as a guest on Sunday NFL Countdown, he correctly picked the New Orleans Saints to win their Week 9 game at home against the Los Angeles Rams.

Ohio State – Penn State and Alabama – LSU are the most featured matchups, appearing 11 times on College Gameday. Alabama – Georgia and Florida – Tennessee have been featured 9 times. Alabama – Auburn, Florida – Florida State, Florida State – Miami, Michigan – Ohio State, and Army – Navy currently sit at 8.

Personalities

Current 
Rece Davis: (Host, 2015–present)
Lee Corso: (Analyst, 1987–present)
Kirk Herbstreit: (Analyst, 1996–present)
Desmond Howard: (Analyst, 2005–present)
Pat McAfee: (Contributor, 2019–2020; Analyst, 2022–present)
David Pollack: (Analyst/Contributor, 2011–present)
Gene Wojciechowski: (Contributor, 1992–present)
Jen Lada: (Contributor, 2016–present)
Robert Griffin III: (Contributor, 2021–present)
Jess Sims: (Reporter, 2022–present)

Former 
Trev Alberts: (In-Studio Analyst, 2002–2005)
Erin Andrews: (Reporter/Contributor, 2010–2011)
Tim Brando: (Host, 1987–1988)
Bob Carpenter: (Host, 1989)
Beano Cook: (Analyst, 1987–1990)
Chris "Bear" Fallica: (Researcher/Contributor, 1996–2022)
Chris Fowler: (Host, 1990–2014)
Craig James: (Analyst, 1990–1995)
Rocket Ismail: (Contributor, 2003–2004)
Nick Lachey: (Contributor, 2005)
Norm Hitzges: (Contributor, 1992–1995)
Samantha Ponder: (Reporter/Contributor, 2012–2016)
Tom Rinaldi: (Contributor, 2011–2020)
Maria Taylor: (Reporter/Contributor, 2017–2020)

History 

In 1993, GameDay began broadcasting live from outside a stadium hosting a game most Saturdays. The selected stadium is usually hosting one of the biggest matchups of the day, regardless of whether the game airs on an ESPN network. The first show "on the road" took place at South Bend, Indiana for the match-up between #2 Notre Dame and #1 FSU on November 13.

The show takes on a festive tailgate party atmosphere, as thousands of fans gather behind the broadcast set, in view of the show's cameras. Many fans bring flags or hand-painted signs as well, and the school's cheerleaders and mascots often join in the celebration.  Crowds at GameDay tapings are known to be quite boisterous and very spirited. Flags seen at the broadcast are not limited to those of the home team; for example, one large Washington State flag can be seen at every broadcast, regardless of the location or the teams involved. The idea began in 2003 on WSU online fan forums and has resulted in the flag, nicknamed "Ol' Crimson," being present at 281 consecutive GameDay broadcasts since 2003.

The show's current intro and theme music is performed by country music duo Big & Rich, who perform their 2005 crossover hit "Comin' to Your City" with revised lyrics which mention several top college teams and a guest appearance by Cowboy Troy.  Rap artist Travie McCoy (of Gym Class Heroes) now appears in the intro for this show, starting with 2014 season, as well as Lzzy Hale, lead vocalist and guitarist of the rock group Halestorm.  Additional music that has been used for the show include "Boom" by the rock group P.O.D. and God Bless Saturday by Kid Rock.

Typically, the show will end with Lee Corso and Kirk Herbstreit issuing their predictions for that day's key matchups, finishing with the game to be played at the stadium hosting GameDay, for which Corso signifies his prediction by donning the head piece of the mascot of his predicted winner. Starting with the 2009 season, a celebrity guest picker gives picks for the day's key games alongside the GameDay regulars (such as Bob Knight when GameDay aired from Texas Tech in 2008, NASCAR star Dale Earnhardt Jr. when GameDay aired from Bristol Motor Speedway (a NASCAR track) in 2016 and Verne Lundquist in Tuscaloosa, Alabama, since it was his final season calling College Football games on CBS). Prior to 2009, this was not done on a regular basis. Herbstreit, who in 2006 became a game analyst for ABC's Saturday Night Football, is not allowed to make a pick for the game at which he is assigned due to parent company Disney's conflict-of-interest rules; however, he is allowed to give one or two keys to the game.

In past years, when no suitably important game was available, it would originate instead from the ESPN studios. In 2017, with no suitably important game available, one show aired from Times Square instead.

College GameDay was also a source for many arguments regarding the purported east coast bias: From 1993 until 2004, GameDay had only been to two regular season games on the entire West Coast (1998 at UCLA and 2000 at Oregon). Given the popularity of the show and the media coverage it brought to the highlighted game, teams and fans of the West Coast teams felt that the show was only magnifying the perceived problems with excess media focus on East, South and Midwest games; ESPN attributed its lack of West Coast games to the need for a very early start time (07:00 AM PST) and an alleged lack of high quality matchups.

With the addition of the Saturday Night Football game on ABC in 2006, GameDay has increasingly aired from that game. This could be done for many reasons including the fact Kirk Herbstreit is on both programs, thus making it easier for him. Another reason could be to give the Saturday Night Football game added exposure.

Beginning with the show's 21st season (2007), College GameDay began broadcasting in high-definition on ESPN HD. Also the same season, California became the first (and as of 2022, only) team to decline to host College GameDay, as the school believed Gameday should go to Virginia Tech after the Virginia Tech shooting earlier in the year.

College GameDay expanded to 3 hours, with the first hour being televised on ESPNU beginning September 4, 2010.  In addition, ESPN Radio simulcasts the television version from 9am-noon ET.  Other changes include the addition of a female contributor—first Erin Andrews in 2010 and 2011, and then Samantha Ponder (then known by her maiden name, Samantha Steele) after Andrews left ESPN for Fox following the 2011 season. Both Andrews and Ponder have anchored several segments during the first hour on ESPNU, contributed during the ESPN portion, and also worked as a sideline reporter on the game from which College GameDay originated, if it aired on one of the ESPN family of networks (i.e. ESPN, ESPN2, ESPNU, ABC).

Beginning with the 2013 season, the third hour moved to ESPN and was hosted by Fowler. Starting in 2014, the show began a now annual visit to the Army-Navy Game in mid-December. As of 2018, the entire show is simulcast on both ESPN and ESPNU.

As previously mentioned, beginning with the 29th season (2015), Rece Davis (who is also the host of the college basketball version) replaced Chris Fowler as the football version's new host.  Fowler retained his play-by-play duties on ABC's Saturday Night Football.

In March 2018, ESPN announced that it would broadcast a special edition of College GameDay from Arlington, Texas, as a pre-show for its coverage of day 1 of the 2018 NFL Draft. The broadcast accompanied a secondary telecast of the draft on ESPN2, which was hosted by the College GameDay panelists (barring Kirk Herbstreit, as he was involved in ESPN's main broadcast to replace the outgoing Jon Gruden).

In the 2020 season, College GameDay underwent modifications due to the COVID-19 pandemic. The program was broadcast without an audience, and with a modified desk to comply with social distancing rules. Corso did not travel with the travel with the remainder of the College GameDay panel due to health concerns, and appeared from his Orlando home, as well as filmed sketches with appearances by team mascots.

As of 2018, College GameDay has collected eight Sports Emmy Awards for Outstanding Studio Show, tied with TNT's Inside the NBA for the most wins by an analysis program.

Locations

1993 season

1994 season

1995 season

1996 season

1997 season

1998 season

1999 season

2000 season

2001 season

2002 season

2003 season

2004 season

2005 season

2006 season

2007 season

2008 season

2009 season

2010 season

2011 season

2012 season

2013 season

2014 season

2015 season

2016 season

2017 season

2018 season

2019 season

2020 season

2021 season

2022 season

Notes

Winners are listed in bold. 
Home team listed in italics for neutral-site or off-campus games.
All rankings displayed for Division I-A/FBS teams are from the AP Poll or CFP Rankings (starting in the 2014 season) at the time of the game. FCS rankings are from the STATS LLC poll at the time of the game.

Appearances by school 
Appearances through January 9, 2023

Power Five schools who have not yet hosted 
Appearances through November 19, 2022

Frequent Matchups 

College Gameday has attended several particular matchups with regularity.

AP Number 1 vs Number 2

Celebrity guest pickers 
Auburn and NBA basketball player Charles Barkley was the first celebrity guest picker on the October 2, 2004, show and has  made the most show appearances with six, with his most recent appearance on December 14, 2019.  Olympian and Arizona swimmer Amanda Beard was the first female celebrity guest picker on November 21, 2009.  Georgia golfer Bubba Watson became the first celebrity picker to pick all games correctly on September 28, 2013.  Oklahoma State and NBA player Marcus Smart became the first ever student athlete guest picker on November 23, 2013.  The Oregon Duck became the first school mascot to be the guest picker on September 6, 2014. Guests have included military veterans, Make-A-Wish Foundation kids, athletes, school mascots, professional sports owners, CEO's, singers, actors & celebrity personalities.

Appearances through December 3, 2022:

International Broadcasts 
In the UK, College GameDay is shown in full on BT Sport unless live sport is being aired on all of its channels.

Spin-offs 
College GameDay (basketball) (2005–present)
ESPN Radio College GameDay (2000–present)
SEC Nation (2014–present)

References

External links 

College Gameday (Football) website at ESPNtv.com
ESPN College GameDay Information (compiled with help from ESPN research staff & school SIDs)

1990s American television series
2000s American television series
2010s American television series
2020s American television series
1987 American television series debuts
American sports television series
College football studio shows
ESPN original programming